Carl Hamilton Smith (born April 26, 1948) is an American football coach who is the associate head coach for the Seattle Seahawks of the National Football League (NFL). He had previously served as quarterbacks coach of the Cleveland Browns and offensive coordinator for the NFL's Jacksonville Jaguars and New Orleans Saints. 

Smith attended Wasco Union High School in Wasco, California.

College career
Smith started his college playing career at Bakersfield College, a junior college in Bakersfield, California, where he played quarterback from 1966 to 1967.  He transferred to Cal Poly San Luis Obispo, where he played two seasons at defensive back from 1969 to 1970.  Smith earned his bachelor's (1971) and master's (1972) degrees in physical education from Cal Poly, as well as a teaching credential.

Coaching career
From 1997 to 1999, Smith was an assistant coach for the New England Patriots, at the time led by head coach Pete Carroll.

Smith was fired from the Jaguars on January 2, 2007. After taking two years off from football, he was hired on January 6, 2009, to be the quarterbacks coach at USC; he had held the position for the 2004 season, when the Trojans won a national championship and quarterback Matt Leinart won the Heisman Trophy.  However, after only two weeks on the job, he left USC to join the Cleveland Browns.

Smith was hired to be quarterbacks coach of the Seahawks, effective February 24, 2011. He won his first Super Bowl title when the Seahawks defeated the Denver Broncos in Super Bowl XLVIII.

On February 5, 2019, Smith was hired as the quarterbacks coach for the Houston Texans. The Seahawks brought him back as the team's associate head coach on March 3, 2021.

References

External links
 Seattle Seahawks bio
 USC bio

USC Trojans football coaches
Jacksonville Jaguars coaches
National Football League offensive coordinators
New Orleans Saints coaches
New England Patriots coaches
Colorado Buffaloes football coaches
1948 births
Living people
Cleveland Browns coaches
Seattle Seahawks coaches
Houston Texans coaches
People from Wasco, California
Louisiana Ragin' Cajuns football coaches
Lamar Cardinals football coaches
NC State Wolfpack football coaches
Cal Poly Mustangs football players
Bakersfield Renegades football players